Jüri Luik (born 17 August 1966 in Tallinn) is an Estonian diplomat and politician who served as the Minister of Defence in the government of Prime Minister Jüri Ratas. In addition, he chaired the EPP Defense Ministers Meeting, which gathers the center-right EPP ministers ahead of meetings of the Foreign Affairs Council (FAC).

Career in diplomacy 
Prior to his current position, Luik was from 2003 - 2007 the Ambassador Extraordinary and Plenipotentiary of the Republic of Estonia to Canada, the United Mexican States and the United States of America. He has been active in Estonian foreign affairs since 1991.

Political career 
Luik has held the positions of Estonian Minister of Foreign Affairs.

See also

 Estonian Defence Forces

References

External links

1966 births
Living people
Politicians from Tallinn
Defence Ministers of Estonia
Ambassadors of Estonia to Russia
Ambassadors of Estonia to Canada
Ambassadors of Estonia to Mexico
Ambassadors of Estonia to the United States
Permanent Representatives of Estonia to NATO
Recipients of the Order of the National Coat of Arms, 3rd Class
Ministers of Foreign Affairs of Estonia
21st-century Estonian politicians
Members of the Riigikogu, 1992–1995